Gerretsen, Gerrets and Gerretse are Dutch patronymic surnames. Notable people with this name include:

 Boris Gerrets (born 1948), Dutch-born film director
 Chas Gerretsen (born 1943), Dutch photojournalist
 John Gerretsen (born 1942), Canadian politician
 Mark Gerretsen (born 1975), Canadian politician
 Wolphert Gerretse van Kouwenhoven (1579–1662), Dutch settler in New Netherland known by his patronym Gerretse
 Grace Gerretsen (born 1998)

See also
Gerritsen

Dutch-language surnames
Patronymic surnames
Surnames from given names